Vista Tower (formerly Empire Tower) is part of an integrated development known as The Intermark. Located on Jalan Tun Razak in Kuala Lumpur city centre, The Intermark comprises an office building - Integra Tower, a "landmark" office building – Vista Tower, a DoubleTree by Hilton Hotel, and a  retail podium.

Phase 1 of the development includes the Vista Tower, retail podium and a Doubletree by Hilton Hotel, the first in Southeast Asia.

It was proposed to be acquired by AmanahRaya Reit in September 2017 for MYR 455 million.

See also
List of tallest buildings in Kuala Lumpur

References

1994 establishments in Malaysia
Skyscraper office buildings in Kuala Lumpur
Office buildings completed in 1994
20th-century architecture in Malaysia